Estádio Engenheiro Vidal Pinheiro was a multi-use stadium in Porto, Portugal.  It was used mostly for football matches and was the home stadium of S.C. Salgueiros. The stadium was able to hold 11,000 people. It was demolished in 2006 to make way for a subway station for Metro do Porto.

References

Engenheiro Vidal Pinheiro
Sports venues completed in 1932
Sports venues demolished in 2006